The A to Z Recordings is an eight-volume live album by Australian rock musician, Paul Kelly, which was released on 24 September 2010 on Gawd Aggie Records in Australia and Universal Import in North America. It had been recorded from a series of performances from 2004 to 2010 on Kelly's A to Z Tours in various locations. The tours led to Kelly writing his memoir, How to Make Gravy (named for the song of the same name), also in September 2010. Kelly's A to Z Tours continued until March 2012. Rolling Stones Jason Cohen described the release as "a 106-track, eight-CD boxed set culled from Kelly's now-trademark A to Z live performances" and, with the associated memoir, Kelly "might be creating the world's longest CD liner notes" at 568 pages.

Background

The A to Z Recordings originate from a series of acoustic concerts by Australian rock musician, Paul Kelly starting in December 2004 with 100 songs performed alphabetically over four nights at The Famous Spiegeltent in Melbourne. In November–December 2006 Kelly undertook his A to Z Tour at the Brisbane Powerhouse, Melbourne's Spiegeltent, and at the Sydney Opera House. On his A to Z Tours, over subsequent years to 2010, Kelly was often accompanied by his nephew, Dan Kelly, on guitar and vocals and sometimes by his then-girlfriend, Sian Prior, on clarinet and vocals. For some of his North American shows, he cut back his performance to only one or two nights, "the speed-dial version". Kelly would provide anecdotes or background for each song, which led to his writing a memoir, How to Make Gravy (named for the song of the same name), issued in September 2010. The book contains a chapter per song with the lyrics supplied followed by Kelly's description of varied topics. According to Rolling Stones Jason Cohen, Kelly "might be creating the world's longest CD liner notes" at 568 pages. It was released in "tandem with The A to Z Recordings, a 106-track, eight-CD boxed set culled from Kelly's now-trademark A to Z live performances". The boxed set was issued on 24 September 2010 by Gawd Aggie Records in Australia and Universal Import in North America. In October that year, the book and boxed set were packaged together and issued as How to Make Gravy: The A to Z Recordings.

In January 2011 The Sydney Morning Heralds Bernard Zuel caught the first two nights of a four night set, he disputed the "accepted wisdom that acoustic performances were the test of a song's lasting quality" and preferred when Kelly's nephew Dan "add[ed] colour guitar or extra vocals to particular songs" or when Prior "provided scattered 'furnishings', playing clarinet, briefly bringing some operatic vocals to the party and noticeably brightening proceedings". Zuel felt the first night was "lacking some energy, vocal and physical" and that "the show's highlights came in the purely solo songs about or from the perspective of women". Kelly's A to Z Tours continued until March 2012.

Composition and recording
In November 2011, The A to Z Recordings were featured in two parts on The Weekend Planet program on Radio National (Australian Broadcasting Corporation) with Doug Spencer presenting tracks "beside another artist's utterly different (often, wordless) take on the same subject, or closely related theme". Spencer described some of the collection's tracks: "Adelaide" is a "21st century 'live' version of a song Paul wrote early in the 1980s, when his former home-city was a fresher 'wound'". For the song Kelly "sings and strums acoustic guitar, with nephew Dan Kelly's electric guitar". "Cities of Texas" is "spare – Paul's voice, [acoustic] guitar and harmonica – in the persona of the wind". Kelly's inspirations are seeing Dallas from the front of a tour bus in 1987 and reading Percy Bysshe Shelley's sonnet Ozymandias. "Don't Explain" is "a deliciously wry song, in persona of an older woman, brushing off her 'toy boy'. Kelly, solo – voice and [acoustic] guitar". It was written as an answer song to Billie Holiday's 1946 track of the same name. "Lately" is "as close to 'croon-ville' as Paul Kelly gets", and is partly inspired by Frank Sinatra's songbook. Kelly's singing and chordal acoustic guitar, is joined by Sian Prior's clarinet. "If I Could Just Start Today Again" is regarded by Kelly "as his 'most precise', most perfectly proportioned song. He says he has no idea how he wrote it, 'without thought or struggle'". For the track he sings and fingerpicks his guitar. On "I Can't Believe We Were Married" he is joined by Dan on harmony vocal. Spencer finds "Dumb Things" is a "very exuberant version, 'live' with [Kelly's] vocal and whooping and [acoustic] guitar, with [Dan] playing up a storm on ripe [electric] guitar".

The second program showcased "Winter Coat" which Spencer declared was "a superbly written, bittersweet song, in which the coat lives on, long after the departure of the lover who bought it for him" with Kelly playing solo. While "You Can Put Your Shoes Under My Bed" addresses "a somewhat errant longtime friend/ former flame" with Kelly providing vocals, piano and harmonica. His rendition of "Maralinga (Rainy Land)" is a "[v]ery good performance of an extraordinary song. It adopts the personae of two of the (many) indigenous Australians who were irradiated when Britain dropped atomic bombs into South Australia's desert country in 1957 and 1958". Kelly is joined by Dan on electric guitar and backing vocals. "Shane Warne" is perceived as a "nicely silly calypso-cricket song about Shane Warne. [Prior] plays the clarinet. [Kelly] borrowed the tune from Lord Kitchener's "London is the Place for Me". "Smoke Under the Bridge" tells the story of its protagonist, 'Banjo' Clark, "a young black man in mid-century rural Australia ... [who, later] was well-known, widely respected and much loved". It was delivered as an "intimate, quiet song, performed solo". "Meet Me in the Middle of the Air" was performed a capella with the title "common to various blues, gospel and spiritual songs. The other words come from Psalm 23". "My Way Is to You" is a "[v]ery haunting song and performance. Kelly sings and plays acoustic guitar. Nephew and co-author Dan plays atmospheric electric guitar. The lyric is – by design – equally open to 'entirely secular' and to 'sacred' interpretations". "Other People's Houses" has the lyrics spoken instead of sung – except the choruses. Spencer feels it is "[b]eautifully written, eventually blurring the 'he' and the 'I' and the 'child, then' and the 'adult, now', still haunted thirty years later".

In a 2002 interview with Debbie Kruger, Kelly indicated that the song, "To Her Door" (1987) took seven years to write. Kelly uses the same protagonist in "Love Never Runs on Time" from 1994's Wanted Man and then in 1996's "How to Make Gravy" from the extended play of the same name. All three tracks appear on The A to Z Recordings.

Track listing
All tracks are written by Paul Kelly except as shown.

The A to Z Recordings parallels Kelly's memoir, How to Make Gravy, however, "[t]wo songs, 'This Land Is Mine' and 'Treaty' are not included in the box set as they defy stripped-back reworking".

Personnel
Musicians
 Paul Kelly – acoustic guitar, harmonica, lead vocals, piano
 Dan Kelly – electric guitar, vocals, ukulele
 Sian Prior – clarinet, vocals (on six tracks)

Production details
 Paul Kelly – producer

References

General

Specific

Paul Kelly (Australian musician) albums
2010 live albums